The United States Senate election of 1924 in Massachusetts was held on November 4, 1924. Incumbent Senator David I. Walsh ran for a second term in office but was defeated by Republican Speaker of the U.S. House Frederick H. Gillett.

Democratic primary

Candidates
 David I. Walsh, incumbent Senator

Results
Senator Walsh was unopposed for renomination.

Republican primary

Candidates
 Louis A. Coolidge, former Assistant U.S. Treasury Secretary, founding president of Sentinels of the Republic, and former private secretary to Senator Henry Cabot Lodge
 Frederick W. Dallinger, U.S. Representative from Cambridge
 Frederick H. Gillett, Speaker of the United States House of Representatives

Declined
Channing Cox, Governor of Massachusetts
Benjamin Loring Young, Speaker of the Massachusetts House of Representatives

Campaign
The early campaign was dominated by President Calvin Coolidge's efforts to recruit a candidate aligned with his own re-election campaign. Louis A. Coolidge (no relation) was the first candidate to formally announce his campaign. He spent much of the early campaign criticizing the President and other national Republicans' efforts to "interfere" in the race. President Coolidge's primary recruit was Governor Channing Cox, who had served as Lieutenant Governor when President Coolidge was Governor of Massachusetts.

Governor Cox announced he was not a candidate in early May, and Speaker of the House Frederick H. Gillett immediately announced his campaign after consulting with President Coolidge's advisor Frank Stearns. At the same time, U.S. Representative Frederick W. Dallinger made his informal campaign formal.

One of the dividing issues in the campaign was Prohibition. Louis Coolidge announced his outright opposition to the Eighteenth Amendment. Dallinger explicitly supported Prohibition. Gillett, who had voted against the Amendment but in favor of the Volstead Act to enforce its provisions, was considered a moderate.

Results

General election

Candidates
 Frederick H. Gillett, Speaker of the United States House of Representatives (Republican)
 Antoinette F. Konikow, physician and feminist activist (Workers')
 David I. Walsh, incumbent Senator since 1919 (Democratic)

Results

References

Massachusetts
1924
1924 Massachusetts elections